Scopula dorsinigrata is a moth of the  family Geometridae. It is found in south-eastern Peru.

References

Moths described in 1904
dorsinigrata
Moths of South America